83 Aquarii (abbreviated 83 Aqr) is a binary star system in the equatorial constellation of Aquarius. The combined apparent visual magnitude of the pair is 5.43, which is faintly visible to the naked eye.

Both stars are F-type main sequence stars. The first component has an apparent magnitude of 6.20; the second is magnitude 6.34. They are orbiting each other with a period of 21.84 years with an eccentricity of 0.388.

References

External links
 Image 83 Aquarii

Aquarii, h
Aquarii, 083
218060
Binary stars
Aquarius (constellation)
113996
F-type main-sequence stars
8782
BD-08 6018